The 1947 Wimbledon Championships took place on the outdoor grass courts at the All England Lawn Tennis and Croquet Club in Wimbledon, London, United Kingdom. The tournament was held from Monday 23 June until Saturday 5 July 1947. It was the 61st staging of the Wimbledon Championships. In 1947, as in 1946, Wimbledon was held before the French Championships and was thus the second Grand Slam tennis event of the year. Jack Kramer and Margaret Osborne won the singles titles.

Finals

Seniors

Men's singles

 Jack Kramer defeated  Tom Brown, 6–1, 6–3, 6–2

Women's singles

 Margaret Osborne defeated  Doris Hart, 6–2, 6–4

Men's doubles

 Bob Falkenburg /  Jack Kramer defeated  Tony Mottram /  Bill Sidwell, 8–6, 6–3, 6–3

Women's doubles

 Doris Hart /  Patricia Todd defeated  Louise Brough /  Margaret Osborne, 3–6, 6–4, 7–5

Mixed doubles

 John Bromwich /  Louise Brough defeated  Colin Long /  Nancye Wynne Bolton, 1–6, 6–4, 6–2

Juniors

Boys' singles

 Kurt Nielsen defeated  Sven Davidson, 8–6, 6–1, 9–7

Girls' singles

 Geneviève Domken defeated  Birgit Wallén, 6–1, 6–4

References

External links
 Official Wimbledon Championships website

 
Wimbledon Championships
Wimbledon Championships
Wimbledon Championships
Wimbledon Championships